Dolibois may refer to:

Dolibois House, locale of the Embassy of the United States, Luxembourg
Dolibois European Center, an overseas campus of Miami University, and based in Differdange, in south-western Luxembourg
John E. Dolibois (1918–2014), American diplomat, Ambassador to Luxembourg (1981–1985)